Killua is a civil parish in County Westmeath, Ireland.

Killua is one of 7 civil parishes in the barony of Delvin in the Province of Leinster. The largest population centre is the small town of Clonmellon.

Killua civil parish comprises 12 townlands: Ballinlough, Clonmellon, Cloran & Corcullentry, Corcullentry aka Cloran & Corcullentry, Dervotstown, Heathstown, Killua, Kilrush Lower, Kilrush Upper, Knock Killua, Moygrehan Lower, Moygrehan Upper and Paristown.

The neighbouring civil parishes are:  Killallon and Kilskeer (both County Meath) to the north, Girley (County Meath) to the east and Delvin to the south and west.

References

External links
Killua civil parish at the IreAtlas Townland Data Base
Killua civil parish at townlands.ie
Killua civil parish at The Placename Database of Ireland

Civil parishes of County Westmeath